Sargent Township is a township in Texas County, in the U.S. state of Missouri.

Erected in 1917, Sargent Township takes its name from the community of Sargent.

References

Townships in Missouri
Townships in Texas County, Missouri